This is the list of the national parks of Indonesia. Of the 54 national parks, 6 are World Heritage Sites, 9 are part of the World Network of Biosphere Reserves and 5 are wetlands of international importance under the Ramsar convention. A total of 9 parks are largely marine. Around 9% of the Indonesia surface are national parks (less than the 25% of Germany or the 33% of France).

The first group of five Indonesian national parks were established in 1980. This number increased constantly reaching 41 in 2003. In a major expansion in 2004, nine more new national parks were created, raising the total number to 50. Mount Tambora was added in 2015. 3 more National Parks in Sumatra, Sulawesi, and Bangka Island were added in 2016.

Java

Kalimantan

Lesser Sunda Islands

Maluku and Papua

Sulawesi

Sumatra

See also

 Protected areas of Indonesia

References

External links

 Official list of Indonesian National Parks

National parks of Indonesia, List of
Indonesia
 
Natural history of Indonesia
Cultural Properties of Indonesia
National parks